The 1947 Amritsar train massacre was an attack on a railway train full of Muslim refugees in Amritsar, East Punjab, during the Partition of India on 22 September 1947. Three thousand Muslims were killed and a further one thousand wounded. Only one hundred passengers were uninjured  These murders demonstrated that railway carriages provided very little protection from physical assault.  After several such attacks on Muslims by Sikhs armed with rifles, swords, and spears, the Government of Pakistan stopped all trains from the Indian Punjab to the Pakistani Punjab at the end of September 1947. The Sikh Jathas, which were ruthless,  led the attacks for ethnically cleansing the Eastern Punjab of Muslims.  Earlier in September, they had massacred 1,000 Muslims on a Pakistan-bound train near Khalsa College, Amritsar. The violence was the most pronounced in the Indian East Punjab.  Sir Francis Mudie who had become governor of the West Punjab in mid-August 1947, noted that a quick succession of attacks on refugee trains headed west to the border from Amritsar and Jullundur districts in East Punjab, India, between 21 and 23 September 1947  included one on a train aboard which every occupant was killed.

Massacre 
On Monday, 22 September 1947, a train was leaving 30 miles east from Amritsar and was attacked by Sikhs. This attack was repulsed. Trains carrying Sikh troops did pass by during the attack, but they did not intervene.

However, when the same train arrived at Amritsar, crowds of armed Sikh people opened fire at it from both sides of the track. Hindu Jats, the train's escorts, were ordered by the commanding British officer to shoot at the attackers but they fired to deliberately miss the attackers. The commanding officer of the train was left alone to fend for the train. He reportedly shot back at the raiders with a machine gun until it ran out of ammunition. He was killed soon after, reportedly by his own men. Men, women, and children were attacked by Sikhs who swept through the train. The weapons used by the Sikhs during this attack included swords, spears and rifles. The slaughter lasted for approximately three hours.

The next, the train was returned to its platform.

Effects 
The West Punjab Government announced other attacks that happened during the 1947 Partition of India. This included the attack of a refugee train in Kamoke carrying Sikh-Hindu passengers around 25 miles west of Lahore on Wednesday, 24 September. This attack was responsible for a further 340 deaths of both Sikhs and Hindus and wounded a further 250. Following the massacre the West Punjab Government announced a ban on refugee convoys from West Punjab.

Meetings within the Indian cabinet to stop further attacks were called the next day, as reported by the Associated Press of Great Britain. Military spokesmen reported on the mounting tensions in the Punjab and the serious attacks on refugee trains and convoys.

References

Further reading 

Anti-Muslim violence in India
Massacres of Muslims
Transport in Amritsar
1947 in India
Mass murder in 1947
Massacres in 1947
September 1947 events in Asia
1947 in rail transport
Transport disasters in 1947
India–Pakistan relations
1947 in British India
Railway accidents and incidents in Punjab, India
1947 disasters in India
1947 murders in India